We Got This is a triple-studio album released by the Washington, D.C.-based go-go musician Chuck Brown. The triple-album consists of one audio CD containing five new songs, one 22-track audio CD from Chuck Brown's live concert at the 9:30 Club, and one video DVD of the same show. The 22-track songs are presented as one continuous medley, including many of his well-known songs. We Got This consists of collaborations with Jill Scott, Ledisi, and Marcus Miller. The album was dedicated to the memories of Little Benny.

The single "LOVE" received a Grammy nomination for "Best R&B Performance by a Duo or Group with Vocals". However, the song lost the award to "Soldier of Love" by Sade at the 53rd Annual Grammy Awards.

Track listing

Personnel
Chuck Brown – electric guitar, lead vocals
"Sweet" Cherie Mitchell – vocals, keyboards
K.K. Donelson – vocals
Marcus Miller – bass guitar, guest vocals
Anthony Harley – trumpet, guest vocals
Andre "Whiteboy" Johnson – guest vocals
Jill Scott – guest vocals
Ledisi – guest vocals, producer
"Blazin" Bryan Mills – tenor saxophone, keyboard, background vocals
Carl "Chucky" Thompson – producer
Maurice "Mighty Moe" Hagans – percussions
Karlston "Ice" Ross – bass guitar
Kenny "Kwickfoot" Gross – drums
"Bad" Brad Clements – trumpet
Greg Boyer – trombone
Marlon Winder – trumpet

References

External links
We Got This at Discogs
We Go This (Chuck Brown interview from February 2, 2011) at NPR's World Cafe
We Got This live performance at NPR Music's Tiny Desk Concerts

2010 albums
Chuck Brown albums
Jazz-funk albums
Neo soul albums